The 1993 Prince Edward Island general election was held on March 29, 1993.

The campaign resulted in the re-election of the governing Liberals under Premier Catherine Callbeck, the province's first female premier, who had taken over only two months previous from former premier Joe Ghiz. Despite dropping in the popular vote, the Liberals gained on its seat tally, taking 31 of 32 seats, with only PC Leader Pat Mella as the sole opposition member in the Legislature.

This election featured several notable events. It was the first to see a female party leader lead her party to a victory in  a general election, it was also the first to feature two women leading the two major parties. It was the last to use the dual-member constituencies that had been in place since 1893.

Party standings

Members elected

The Legislature of Prince Edward Island had two levels of membership from 1893 to 1996 - Assemblymen and Councillors. This was a holdover from when the Island had a bicameral legislature, the General Assembly and the Legislative Council.

In 1893, the Legislative Council was abolished and had its membership merged with the Assembly, though the two titles remained separate and were elected by different electoral franchises. Assemblymen were elected by all eligible voters within a district. Before 1963, Councillors were only elected by landowners within a district, but afterward they were elected in the same manner as Assemblymen.

Assemblymen

|-
|bgcolor="whitesmoke"|1st Kings
||
|Roger Soloman1,681
|
|Craig Norton1,279
|
|
||
|Ross Young
|-
|bgcolor="whitesmoke"|2nd Kings
||
|Claude Matheson1,031
|
|Henry Compton786
|
|Martin Kenny85
||
|Claude Matheson
|-
|bgcolor="whitesmoke"|3rd Kings
||
|Peter Doucette1,436
|
|John Callaghan1,133
|
|
||
|Peter Doucette
|-
|bgcolor="whitesmoke"|4th Kings
||
|Stanley Bruce1,540
|
|Marjory Tattrie1,053
|
|Janet MacDonald164
||
|Stanley Bruce
|-
|bgcolor="whitesmoke"|5th Kings
||
|Rose Marie MacDonald1,098
|
|Hal Jamieson601
|
|
||
|Rose Marie MacDonald
|-
|bgcolor="whitesmoke"|1st Queens
||
|Marion Murphy1,598
|
|Wilber Lamont1,065
|
|Karen Kelly-Fyfe184
||
|Marion Murphy
|-
|bgcolor="whitesmoke"|2nd Queens
||
|Gordon MacInnis3,916
|
|George Watts2,783
|
|Marlene Hunt416
||
|Gordon MacInnis
|-
|bgcolor="whitesmoke"|3rd Queens
|
|Betty Jean Brown3,326
||
|Pat Mella4,486
|
|Gerry Birt301
||
|Betty Jean Brown
|-
|bgcolor="whitesmoke"|4th Queens
||
|Alan Buchanan1,343
|
|Wilbur MacDonald1,245
|
|
||
|Alan Buchanan
|-
|bgcolor="whitesmoke"|5th Queens
||
|Wayne Cheverie5,251
|
|Lloyd McKenna3,387
|
|Barbara Boudreau606
||
|Wayne Cheverie
|-
|bgcolor="whitesmoke"|6th Queens
||
|Jeannie Lea3,934
|
|Diane Griffin3,300
|
|Heather DeMille402
||
|Joe Ghiz
|-
|bgcolor="whitesmoke"|1st Prince
||
|Bobby Morrissey3,530
|
|Larry Gaudet2,600
|
|Leroy Hiltz273
||
|Bobby Morrissey
|-
|bgcolor="whitesmoke"|2nd Prince
||
|Keith Milligan1,660
|
|Jimmy Stewart816
|
|Grace Coughlin246
||
|Keith Milligan
|-
|bgcolor="whitesmoke"|3rd Prince
||
|Robert Maddix1,942
|
|Emile Gallant1,066
|
|
||
|Léonce Bernard
|-
|bgcolor="whitesmoke"|4th Prince
||
|Stavert Huestis4,215
|
|Fred McCardle2,568
|
|Larry Duchesne825
||
|Stavert Huestis
|-
|bgcolor="whitesmoke"|5th Prince
||
|Walter McEwen2,179
|
|Greg Deighan1,298
|
|Neil Matthews255
||
|Walter McEwen
|}

Councillor

|-
|bgcolor="whitesmoke"|1st Kings
||
|Ross Young1,702
|
|Peter McQuaid1,208
|
|Brian MacDonald83
||
|Albert Fogarty
|-
|bgcolor="whitesmoke"|2nd Kings
||
|Walter Bradley1,081
|
|Kevin MacAdam815
|
|
||
|Walter Bradley
|-
|bgcolor="whitesmoke"|3rd Kings
||
|Roberta Hubley1,369
|
|Doug Johnston1,123
|
|Bruno Peripoli106
||
|Roberta Hubley
|-
|bgcolor="whitesmoke"|4th Kings
||
|Gilbert Clements1,618
|
|Philip Curley912
|
|Alan Hicken235
||
|Gilbert Clements
|-
|bgcolor="whitesmoke"|5th Kings
||
|Barry Hicken1,202
|
|Wesley Stead506
|
|
||
|Barry Hicken
|-
|bgcolor="whitesmoke"|1st Queens
||
|Catherine Callbeck1,602
|
|Ronald Myers1,115
|
|Marvyn Wells150
||
|Leone Bagnall
|-
|bgcolor="whitesmoke"|2nd Queens
||
|Ron MacKinley4,043
|
|Brian Dollar2,729
|
|Gerard Gallant368
||
|Ron MacKinley
|-
|bgcolor="whitesmoke"|3rd Queens
||
|Tom Dunphy3,940
|
|Mildred Dover3,769
|
|Paul McCarron389
||
|Tom Dunphy
|-
|bgcolor="whitesmoke"|4th Queens
||
|Lynwood MacPherson1,553
|
|Lou Douse1,034
|
|
||
|Lynwood MacPherson
|-
|bgcolor="whitesmoke"|5th Queens
||
|Tim Carroll4,463
|
|Chester Gillan4,199
|
|Mickey MacDonald579
||
|Tim Carroll
|-
|bgcolor="whitesmoke"|6th Queens
||
|Paul Connolly4,365
|
|Stuart Drummond2,732
|
|Ronald Kelly515
||
|Paul Connolly
|-
|bgcolor="whitesmoke"|1st Prince
||
|Hector MacLeod3,354
|
|Gary Morgan2,751
|
|Ed Kilfoil297
||
|Bob Campbell
|-
|bgcolor="whitesmoke"|2nd Prince
||
|Randy Cooke1,459
|
|Donna Williams720
|
|Herb Dickieson540
||
|Allison Ellis
|-
|bgcolor="whitesmoke"|3rd Prince
||
|Edward Clark2,229
|
|Lorne Ramsay794
|
|
||
|Edward Clark
|-
|bgcolor="whitesmoke"|4th Prince
||
|Libbe Hubley4,342
|
|Don MacFarlane2,668
|
|Margaret Arsenault598
||
|Libbe Hubley
|-
|bgcolor="whitesmoke"|5th Prince
||
|Nancy Guptill2,441
|
|Mac MacDonald1,108
|
|Gordon Whitlock202
||
|Nancy Guptill
|}

Sources

1993 elections in Canada
Elections in Prince Edward Island
1993 in Prince Edward Island
March 1993 events in Canada